The Railway Association of Canada (RAC) was founded in 1917 as the Canadian Railway War Board in order to coordinate railway activities during World War I. The first meeting of the organization was held on October 23, 1917, and the name was changed to Railway Association of Canada in 1919.  It is headquartered in Ottawa and represents around 50 member railways.

References 

Trade associations based in Canada
Rail transport in Canada
Railway associations